Alexia Estrada Bigue is a Guatemalan footballer who plays as a goalkeeper for American college team City College of San Francisco Rams and the Guatemala women's national team.

Early life
Estrada was born in San Francisco, California, United States and raised in South San Francisco, California. Her father is from San Raymundo, Guatemala and her mother is French. She has attended the South San Francisco High School.

College career
Estrada has attended the City College of San Francisco in the United States.

International career
Estrada made her senior debut for Guatemala on 16 February 2022, starting in a 9–0 home win over the United States Virgin Islands during the 2022 CONCACAF W Championship qualification.

See also
List of Guatemala women's international footballers

References

External links

Living people
People with acquired Guatemalan citizenship
Guatemalan women's footballers
Women's association football goalkeepers
Guatemala women's international footballers
Guatemalan people of French descent
Soccer players from San Francisco
People from South San Francisco, California
American women's soccer players
City College of San Francisco alumni
College women's soccer players in the United States
American people of Guatemalan descent
American sportspeople of North American descent
Sportspeople of Guatemalan descent
American people of French descent
Year of birth missing (living people)